Antiques Roadshow is an American television program broadcast on Public Broadcasting Service (PBS) Public television stations. The program features local antiques owners who bring in items to be appraised by experts.  Provenance, history, and value of the items are discussed. Based on the original British Antiques Roadshow, which premiered in 1979, the American version first aired in 1997. When taping locations are decided, they are announced on the program's website raising the profile of various small to mid-size cities, such as Billings, Montana; Biloxi, Mississippi; Bismarck, North Dakota; Chattanooga, Tennessee; Hot Springs, Arkansas; and Rapid City, South Dakota. Antiques Roadshow has been nominated 16 times for a Primetime Emmy.

During 2005, the American version of Antiques Roadshow produced its own spin-off called Antiques Roadshow FYI, a half-hour program that followed the fate of items appraised in the parent show and provided additional information on antiques and collecting.

History

Creation and premiere
Antiques Roadshow is the American version of the British Broadcasting Corporation program of the same name, which premiered as a special in 1977 and began airing as a regular series in the United Kingdom in 1979. The public television station in Boston, Massachusetts, WGBH-TV, created the American version in 1996 under a license from the BBC. The first American episodes were taped in 1996 and broadcast on PBS in 1997. WGBH-TV produces the show.

In 2001, PBS began airing the original BBC version of Antiques Roadshow in the United States. In the United States, the BBC version is titled Antiques Roadshow UK to differentiate it from the American version.

Hosts
The first host of the American version of Antiques Roadshow was antiques expert Chris Jussel. He hosted the program from 1997 to 2000 (Seasons 1 through 4). He was followed by contemporary art expert Dan Elias, who took over after Jussel's departure and hosted the program from 2001 to 2003 (Seasons 5 through 7). Good Morning America correspondent Lara Spencer replaced Elias as the host, and she hosted from 2004 to 2005 (Seasons 8 and 9). Actor, television personality, and game show host Mark L. Walberg hosted the program from 2006 to 2019 (Seasons 10 through 23). Coral Peña, billed as the narrator rather than host, has narrated the show since Season 24, which was broadcast in 2020.

Format

Seasons 1–19
During the first 19 seasons (1997–2015), each episode began with an on-camera introduction by the host (Chris Jussel, Dan Elias, Lara Spencer, and Mark L. Walberg) followed by footage of the taping location while the host identified the location — a hotel ballroom, convention center, civic arena, or similar facility — in a voiceover. The taping in each city was split into three one-hour episodes, e.g., "Boise Hour 1," "Chattanooga Hour 2," or "Raleigh Hour 3." Various two-to four-minute-long segments of people talking about their item(s) and their appraisers talking about the provenance, history, and value of the item(s) followed, interspersed with several brief informal appraisals, lasting about a minute or so and called "over-the-shoulder appraisals."

In a several-minute "field segment" about halfway through each episode, the host joined one of the show's appraisers to tour a museum or historic site near the episode's taping location, where the appraiser discussed antiques at the site with the host and estimated their value. Each episode ended with the host wrapping things up on camera. In the show's early seasons, the episodes ended with the Antiques Roadshow crew getting ready to turn the studio lights off, and take down the set. In later seasons, the closing credits featuring the crew taking down the set was discontinued, and was replaced by a "Feedback Booth," a series of clips of people talking about their experience at Antiques Roadshow that rolls during the credits. A "Hidden Treasures" segment consisting of two additional appraisals followed the credits.

Seasons 20-22
In Season 20, which aired in 2016, a format change occurred. Although the conventional and "over-the-shoulder" appraisals and the Feedback Booth continued as before, the show adopted a new logo, new graphics for its opening and closing credits, and a new set, and the role of the host was reduced significantly. Segments in which the host appeared on camera were discontinued, and instead the host introduced and closed each episode in a voiceover. The mid-show field segment featuring the host and an appraiser at a local museum or historic site was dropped. In addition, each episode included several quick "snapshot" appraisals; in this new type of appraisal, no appraiser appeared on camera, and instead a guest quickly described his or her object to the camera and a still image of the object followed that included a graphic of the object's appraised value. The Feedback booth survived, but the post-episode "Hidden Treasures" segment disappeared for a time, although it later returned. The taping in each city continued to be split into three one-hour episodes.

In 2016, Antiques Roadshow executive producer Marsha Bemko explained the reasons for the Season 20 changes. The old set, in use since the filming of Season 9 in 2004, had reached the end of its useful life and employed what she viewed as outdated graphics generated using outdated technology, so she used the design and construction of a new set to allow the show to incorporate more modern graphics. The new logo employed the new set's graphics as did the opening credits, which also were changed to reflect a feeling of Antiques Roadshow traveling along a road, in contrast to the old credit sequence's static depiction of objects in an attic. Antiques Roadshow had found that its viewers tended to tune out during the mid-show field segment and preferred to watch appraisals, and dropping the field segment and adding "snapshot" appraisals kept viewers watching and allowed them to see about a dozen additional appraisals per episode.

Season 23 to present

The last three episodes of Season 22 (taped in 2017 and televised in 2018) unveiled another format change which became the standard format for all episodes beginning with Season 23, televised in 2019. As the British version of the show had done over a decade earlier, Antiques Roadshow moved from taping episodes in convention centers and ballrooms to taping them at historic sites, such as mansions, including the first outdoor segments ever recorded for the show. Interspersed among the standard, over-the-shoulder, and snapshot appraisals were brief vignettes describing the history and features of the historic site or discussing people who had once lived in or had founded or funded the site. Although the host (Mark Walberg during Seasons 22 and 23) remained entirely off camera throughout each episode, he served as a narrator for these segments in addition to opening and closing each episode. The Feedback Booth continued to air at the end of each episode, and taping at each site was still split into three one-hour episodes.

Although it remained popular — drawing a cumulative audience of 8 million per week — and enjoyed significant support among PBS donors, the show's viewership measured in terms of household season average had declined 5 percent from the 2016–2017 television season to the 2017–2018 season and 21 percent since the 2012–2013 season, probably because its long-running format was beginning to become stale. Bemko explained in 2018 that the new format, in combination with the changes made for Season 20 three years earlier, was designed to refresh the show and improve its pacing.

Walberg left the show after Season 23 aired in 2019. Coral Peña took over the job of performing each episode's voiceovers in Season 24, broadcast in 2020, and she was billed as the show's narrator rather than its host. With the premiere of Season 24, new half-hour Recut episodes were added (which are edited reruns of previous episodes from the series); these episodes served as one of the replacement programs for Nightly Business Report, which aired its final episode in December 2019.

The 2020 tour, which would have been filmed for new episodes to air in 2021, was cancelled due to the COVID-19 pandemic. Instead, Antiques Road Show appraisers visited various celebrities during 2020 to discuss and appraise their antiques, resulting in four new episodes with this format. With no other new footage available, Season 25, which aired in 2021, otherwise consisted entirely of specials made up of clips from earlier seasons.

The 2021 tour, filmed for broadcast in 2022, returned to appraisals of the antiques of everyday people, but not to appraisal segments filmed during crowded events. Due to the COVID-19 pandemic, guests at each tour stop were invited to have their appraisals filmed on a closed set. The "Feedback Booth" — which previously featured guests who had not appeared on camera during the tour stop — returned, but consisted solely of guests whose appraisals had appeared in the episode.

Antiques Roadshow FYI
During 2005, PBS broadcast Antiques Roadshow FYI, a short-lived spinoff of Antiques Roadshow. The weekly half-hour show, hosted by then-Antiques Roadshow host Lara Spencer, provided information on items shown on previous episodes of Antiques Roadshow, as well as additional information on antiques and collecting provided by Antiques Roadshow appraisers.

Production

Each spring and summer — except in 2020, when covid-19 pandemic forced its cancellation — the Antiques Roadshow production team and appraisers make an annual tour, visiting various cities in the United States. (In 1999 the tour made its only foreign stop, visiting Canada to film in Toronto, Ontario.) The local PBS station usually serves as host for each tour stop. Taping in each location lasts one day, and episodes drawn from that day are broadcast the following year.

During the first 21 seasons and for most of the 22nd season, production followed a routine, predictable pattern, with all taping occurring indoors in a convention center, hotel ballroom, or similar venue. Most filming in these venues could be accomplished by placing cameras in a central location and simply spinning them around to capture various appraisals.

In 2017, when during the 22nd season the show moved to taping at historic sites and began recording outdoor appraisals for the first time, production became more complicated. The venues were far more variable than convention centers and ballrooms and cameras, rather than operating mostly from a central location,  were required to roam the venue to capture appraisals at various locations around the property. The move to outdoor appraisals required contingency planning in case of bad weather. Preproduction work also became more extensive and demanding.  Producers had a large database of convention centers and ballrooms suitable for Antiques Roadshow that they had accumulated in earlier years, but had no familiarity with historic sites or their availability or suitability for an Antiques Roadshow tour stop, and negotiations with owners and proprietors of taping sites also sometimes were more complicated than those with convention centers or ballroom venues. Executive producer Marsha Bemko credited the producers of the BBC version of the show, which had been taping at historic sites and outdoors for over a decade by the time the American show began to do it, for playing an important role as advisers to her team as the American show switched to the new format.

Tickets to attend each tour stop are free, but are provided only to preselected people and on a random basis. Tickets are not available at the tour venue on the day of event. To request tickets, prospective appraisees must fill out a form on the show's official website. Each visitor is guaranteed a free appraisal, whether or not his or her appraisal is recorded for television. During the years of visiting convention centers and ballrooms, Antiques Roadshow distributed 5,000 tickets at each tour stop. During the first tour visiting historic sites, the number of tickets was cut back to 2,500 per tour stop, although visitors were allowed to bring two items each so that the number of appraisals did not drop. In later years, the number of tickets per stop increased again.

Upon arrival on filming day, each visitor checks in at a designated time and is directed to a line to wait in to see an appraiser who can assess his or her object. At each tour stop, about 150 of the 5,000 appraisals are filmed, and of these about 30 eventually appear on television. If an appraiser chooses an object for filming, the visitor may wait between 30 minutes and two hours before his or her segment is filmed.

Regardless of whether taping occurs indoors at convention centers or outdoors at historic sites, the number of new episodes broadcast the following season depends on the number of locations visited on the annual tour. A five-location tour usually results in 24 to 26 new episodes the following season.

Appraisers

About 70 appraisers work at each tour stop. They are volunteers; Antiques Roadshow does not pay them for their services, nor does it compensate them for any of their travel expenses, providing them only with a free breakfast and lunch on each filming day. Appraisers neither buy nor sell items during an Antiques Roadshow tour stop.

Only three producers are on site for any tour stop, and although they circulate to identify items that may be of interest on the show, seeking objects which probably will be the most entertaining to air on the program regardless of their assessed value, they rely heavily on the appraisers to find interesting objects and pitch them to the producers as worthy of filming. Appraisers thus play a vital role in determining which objects are filmed for potential use in an Antiques Roadshow episode. Given the amount of money they spend on travel to participate in an Antiques Roashow tour — often over $10,000 — and the lack of compensation for them by the show, the appraisers have an incentive to get a return on their investment by finding television-worthy objects and getting on camera in the hope of benefiting from the resulting national exposure. Typically, an appraiser gives his or her initial appraisal of an object to the visitor based on knowledge he or she already has, but appraisers usually take advantage of the delay between identifying an object of interest for television and the filming of a segment on it to conduct further research to find additional interesting information on the object and to make sure he or she has the details about it right for the filmed appraisal.

2001 fraud incident
In 1999, a jury awarded a descendant of Confederate Army General George Pickett a US$800,000 judgment against military artifacts dealer Russ Pritchard III, who appeared on Antiques Roadshow as an appraiser, for fraudulently undervaluing Pickett memorabilia, purchasing the items, and then reselling them at a large profit. At the time, Antiques Roadshow producers decided to keep Pritchard on the show, believing that the jury award did not have an impact on his ability to appraise items on Antiques Roadshow. In March 2000, however, revelations that both Pritchard and George Juno — another military artifacts dealer and Antiques Roadshow appraiser and Pritchard's business partner at the company American Ordnance Preservation Association — had staged a fraudulent appraisal in 1997 led the show to sever ties with them. In March 2001, the two men were accused of using their Antiques Roadshow appearances to establish a reputation as experts in American Civil War artifacts and memorabilia by making phony appraisals designed to lure unsuspecting owners of Civil War antiques to do business with their company, subsequently defrauding their victims of hundreds of thousands of dollars. Both men were indicted in March 2001 on charges of wire fraud, mail fraud, witness tampering, and giving false testimony, and additional indictments followed as other fraudulent activities came to light. Juno pleaded guilty in May 2001, as did Pritchard in December 2001. Both were sentenced to prison terms in 2002.

Highest appraisals
The following ten items are recognized as the most valuable items featured on the American Antiques Roadshow:
A 1904 Diego Rivera oil painting, El Albañil, valued with a retail price of $800,000 to $1 million in 2012 by Colleene Fesko. In 2018 the painting was reappraised at $1.2 million to $2.2 million.
On July 23, 2011, a collection of Chinese cups carved from rhinoceros horns, believed to date from the late 17th or early 18th century, was valued at $1–1.5 million by Lark E. Mason, at a show location in Tulsa, Oklahoma.
Four pieces of Chinese carved jade and celadon ceramics dating to the reign of the Qianlong Emperor (1736–95), including a large bowl crafted for the emperor, were given a conservative auction estimate of up to $1.07 million by Asian arts appraiser, James Callahan. However the items sold at auction for only $494,615.
A trove of 1870s Boston Red Stockings (now the Atlanta Braves) memorabilia including players' signatures and rare baseball cards was appraised at $1,000,000 for insurance purposes in New York City on January 5, 2015 by Leila Dunbar.
An Alexander Calder mobile, was appraised in Miami, Florida, at $400,000 to $1,000,000 by Chris Kennedy.
A 1937 Clyfford Still oil painting, valued at $500,000, was appraised by Alasdair Nichol on the first episode of its 13th season on January 5, 2009.
 A Norman Rockwell oil painting was appraised at $500,000 in 2010 in Eugene, Oregon by painting and drawings expert, Nan Chisholm.
 An unused 1971 Rolex Oyster Daytona Chronograph was valued at $500,000-$700,000 in January 2020 at West Fargo, North Dakota
 An Andrew Wyeth watercolor painting was appraised at $450,000 in Raleigh, North Carolina, in 2010, by Nan Chisholm.
 A collection of Charles Schulz Peanuts comic art was appraised at $450,000 in Phoenix, Arizona by pop culture appraiser, Gary Sohmers.
 In 2001, a mid-19th-century Navajo Ute First Phase blanket, believed once to have been owned by Kit Carson, was valued in Tucson, Arizona between $350,000 and $500,000; the appraiser, Donald Ellis, called it a "national treasure."

Seasons
SOURCE

Taping locations by state or province

Forty-seven U.S. states, the District of Columbia, and one Canadian province have hosted Antiques Roadshow tour stops. In 2020, Antiques Roadshow made no tour stops because of the COVID-19 pandemic; the four Celebrity Edition episodes filmed in 2020 and aired in 2021 during Season 25 did not consist of tour stops, and are not included below.

The broadcast years of tour stops follow (the tapings for each stop on a season's itinerary took place the previous year):

Accolades

See also 

 It's Worth What?
 Buried Treasure
 Market Warriors

References

External links
 Official Website
 Program site on PBS.com

1997 American television series debuts
1990s American reality television series
2000s American reality television series
2010s American reality television series
2020s American reality television series
American television series based on British television series
Antiques television series
PBS original programming
Television series by WGBH
English-language television shows

Television series about the history of the United States